Live text may refer to:
 Liveblogging
 iOS 15 Live Text recognition